The 1948 National League Division Three was the second season of British speedway's National League Division Three

The league had expanded from 8 teams to 12. Reigning champions Eastbourne Eagles were forced to close due to a petrol ban at their stadium, so their team moved a few miles along the Sussex coast to Hastings. The new entrants Coventry Bees, Hull Angels, Poole Pirates and Yarmouth Bloaters all struggled to make an impact and finished in the bottom five positions. Exeter Falcons won their first title.

Alf Bottoms of Southampton topped the averages.

Eric Dunn of Hastings Saxons was a third speedway rider (with Reg Craven and Bill Wilson) to be killed during the season. 34-year-old Dunn was riding in a meeting (on 13 June) at the Arlington track when he fell and was hit by a rider behind. He died two days later in hospital (15 June).

Final League table

Leading Averages

National Trophy
The 1948 Trophy was the 11th edition of the Knockout Cup. The Qualifying event for Division 3 teams saw Southampton Saints win the final and qualify for the Elimination event. The Elimination event for Division 2 teams saw Birmingham Brummies win the final and qualify for the Quarter Finals proper.

Qualifying Event First Round

Qualifying Second Round

Qualifying Third Round

Qualifying Final Round
First leg

Second leg

See also
List of United Kingdom Speedway League Champions
Knockout Cup (speedway)

References

Speedway National League Division Three
1948 in British motorsport
1948 in speedway